Ford County is a county located in the U.S. state of Illinois. According to the 2010 United States Census, it had a population of 14,081. Its county seat is Paxton. Ford County was part of the Champaign–Urbana, IL Metropolitan Statistical Area until 2018, when the Office of Management and Budget removed the county from the area.

History
Ford County was formed February 17, 1859 making it Illinois's "newest" county. It was created at the behest of some residents of Vermilion County, who complained to the General Assembly that they lived too far from the county seat. Ford County was named after Thomas Ford, the Governor of Illinois from 1842 to 1846.

Geography

Climate and weather

Adjacent counties
 Kankakee County – north
 Iroquois County – east
 Vermilion County – southeast
 Champaign County – south
 McLean County – southwest
 Livingston County – west

Major highways

  Interstate 57
  US Route 24
  US Route 45
  Illinois Route 9
  Illinois Route 47
  Illinois Route 54
  Illinois Route 115
  Illinois Route 116

Demographics

As of the 2010 United States Census, there were 14,081 people, 5,676 households, and 3,798 families living in the county. The racial makeup of the county was 97.1% white, 0.6% black or African American, 0.3% Asian, 0.2% American Indian, 0.6% from other races, and 1.1% from two or more races. Those of Hispanic or Latino origin made up 2.1% of the population. In terms of ancestry, 35.7% were German, 15.5% were Irish, 13.6% were American, and 10.4% were English.

Of the 5,676 households, 30.6% had children under the age of 18 living with them, 52.8% were married couples living together, 9.8% had a female householder with no husband present, 33.1% were non-families, and 29.2% of all households were made up of individuals. The average household size was 2.41 and the average family size was 2.95. The median age was 42.4 years.

The median income for a household in the county was $48,667 and the median income for a family was $62,819. Males had a median income of $43,849 versus $30,136 for females. The per capita income for the county was $23,401. About 5.4% of families and 8.3% of the population were below the poverty line, including 8.3% of those under age 18 and 8.8% of those age 65 or over.

Communities

Cities
 Gibson City
 Paxton

Villages

 Cabery
 Elliott
 Kempton
 Melvin
 Piper City
 Roberts
 Sibley

Unincorporated communities
 Clarence
 Guthrie
 Perdueville
 Stelle

Extinct settlements
 Ten Mile Grove

Townships

 Brenton
 Button
 Dix
 Drummer
 Lyman
 Mona
 Patton
 Peach Orchard
 Pella
 Rogers
 Sullivant
 Wall

Politics
Ford County is one of the state's most consistently Republican counties; since its 1859 organization it has voted for Republican presidential candidates in all but two elections. In 1912, the GOP was mortally divided and Progressive Theodore Roosevelt carried the county over the more conservative official nominee William Howard Taft; in 1932, at the height of the Great Depression, Franklin D. Roosevelt in the first of his four campaigns became and has remained the only Democrat to carry Ford County. Since 1968 no Democratic presidential candidate has topped 36% of the county's vote, and since the county first formed only three Democrats – all in landslide national victories – have managed 40% of Ford County's votes.

After the Libertarian Party's success in the 1998 election for Ford County Sheriff and other countywide offices, it achieved established party status. At the time this made Ford County the only county in Illinois with three established parties. Due to its second place showing over the then-dormant Democratic Party in that election, the Libertarians received the minority party's seat on the Board of Review and one of the five seats on the Sheriff's Merit Commission. This status was lost by 2002 after the Libertarian Party failed to field any candidates in the 2002 general election.

President Gerald Ford visited Ford County on October 24, 1974, to mark the retirement of Congressman Leslie C. Arends of Melvin who served in Congress for 40 years, including over 30 years as Republican Minority Whip.

See also
 National Register of Historic Places listings in Ford County, Illinois

References

 United States Census Bureau 2007 TIGER/Line Shapefiles
 United States Board on Geographic Names (GNIS)
 United States National Atlas

External links
 History of Ford County - Information from Centurama Celebrating The First 100 Years of Ford County, Illinois 1859-1959

 
Illinois counties
1859 establishments in Illinois
Populated places established in 1859